Kinra (Quechua kimray, kinray, kinra slope, Hispanicized spelling Quinra) is a mountain in the Wansu mountain range in the Andes of Peru, about  high. It is situated in the Cusco Region, Chumbivilcas Province, Santo Tomás District. Kinra lies south of the river Qañawimayu and north of Ch'iyara Ch'iyara.

References 

Mountains of Cusco Region